Eenu Shree is an Indian actress who appears in Bhojpuri films.

Career
She appeared in multiple popular Bhojpuri films including Khiladi, Hogi Pyar Ki Jeet, Dahshat and Tridev.

See also
 List of Bhojpuri cinema actresses

References

Living people
Actresses from Jharkhand
People from Jamshedpur
Actresses in Bhojpuri cinema
Year of birth missing (living people)